Białobrzegi  is a village in Łańcut County, Subcarpathian Voivodeship, in south-eastern Poland. It is the seat of the gmina (administrative district) called Gmina Białobrzegi.

The village has a population of 2,200.

References

Villages in Łańcut County
Lwów Voivodeship